Jason Smith (born September 4, 1973 in Edmonton, Alberta) is a retired male Canadian boxing champion. Smith placed third in the 1995 Pan American Games and won a bronze medal in the men's light middleweight division (- 71 kg).

References

1973 births
Living people
Sportspeople from Edmonton
Canadian male boxers
Boxers at the 1995 Pan American Games
Pan American Games bronze medalists for Canada
Pan American Games medalists in boxing
Light-middleweight boxers
Medalists at the 1995 Pan American Games